John Nicholas "Nick" Newman (born 10 March 1935) is an American naval architect noted for his contributions to marine hydrodynamics. Together with David Evans, he initiated the International Workshop on Water Waves and Floating Bodies. He is also known for his contribution in the development of the wave–structure interaction code WAMIT. He is currently emeritus professor of Naval Architecture at Massachusetts Institute of Technology.

Education and career
Newman's degrees (S.B. 1956, S.M. 1957, and Sc.D. 1960) are all from MIT, and were all taken in the field of Naval Architecture and Marine Engineering. From 1959 to 1967 he worked as a research naval architect at David Taylor Model Basin. In 1967 he moved back to MIT and held a long academic career there.

He is a member of the National Academy of Engineering, and of the Norwegian Academy of Science and Letters. In 1992, the Norwegian University of Science and Technology in Trondheim awarded him an honorary doctorate.

In 2008, a symposium was organized in his honor at the 27th International Conference on Offshore Mechanics and Arctic Engineering.

Personal
Newman is married to Kathleen Smedley Kirk. They have three children.

Books

Selected publications

References

External links
 WAMIT
 International Workshop on Water Waves and Floating Bodies web site

1935 births
Living people
MIT School of Engineering faculty

MIT School of Engineering alumni

Members of the Norwegian Academy of Science and Letters
Members of the United States National Academy of Engineering